Ilana Adir (-Kamarshik; אילנה אדיר-קמרשיק; born June 28, 1941) is an Israeli former Olympic sprinter, and former Israeli Women's Champion in the 100 metre sprint.

She was born in Tel Aviv, Israel, and is Jewish.

Sprinting career
Her personal best in the 100 metres was 12.3 in 1960. That year she was Israeli Women's Champion in the 100 metres, with a time of 12.4.

She competed for Israel at the 1960 Summer Olympics in Rome, Italy, at the age of 19.  In the Women's 100 metres she came in 6th in Heat 5, with a time of 12.9. When she competed in the Olympics, she was 5-4.5 (165 cm) and weighed 128 lbs (58 kg).

References 

1941 births
Living people
Sportspeople from Tel Aviv
Israeli female sprinters
Jewish female athletes (track and field)
Olympic athletes of Israel
Athletes (track and field) at the 1960 Summer Olympics
Olympic female sprinters